Sean Lundon (born 7 March 1969) is an English footballer who played as a full back in the Football League for Chester City.

Lundon was the Head of Academy Coaching at Everton Football Club, having joined their Academy coaching staff in 1999. He left The Toffees in the spring of 2021 after two decades to join Chinese club Guangzhou Evergrande. 

In November 2021, he joined Burnley as Youth Development Phase coach.

References

1969 births
Living people
Footballers from Liverpool
English footballers
Association football fullbacks
Chester City F.C. players
Bath City F.C. players
English Football League players
Everton F.C. non-playing staff
Burnley F.C. non-playing staff